Lake Alexander is a lake in Southeast Alaska,  west of Mole Harbor, on east coast of Admiralty Island;  north-east of Sitka, Alaska in the Alexander Archipelago.

The lake was named in the Alexander Alaska Expedition of 1907 for Annie Montague Alexander, founder of the expedition.

See also
List of lakes of Alaska

References

Bodies of water of Hoonah–Angoon Census Area, Alaska
Lakes of Alaska